Abbas Rahim  (25 January 1979 – 10 August 2012) was an Iraqi football midfielder who played for Iraq in the 2000 Asian Cup and Al-Shorta and Al-Zawraa.

Playing career
Abbas Rahim was born on January 25, 1979, in Baghdad and started his playing career in the junior teams of Al-Nafat and Salikh. At the age of 13, he joined the Talaba youth where he spent two years before joining Al-Karkh - making his first team debut in 1995. A year later he transferred to Al-Shurta winning the league title in 1997-98. After a brief spell at Al-Karkh, he joined ‘the White Seagulls’ Al-Zawraa, winning the double in 2000 and scoring a remarkable seven goals in his first three league games for the club. Abbas joined Al-Shurta for the second time in 2001.

He was a prolific goal scorer at youth level and Under-19 level where he helped Iraq qualify for the AFC Asian Youth Championship in 1998. He had starred for the Iraqi Olympic side and was capable of turning a game on his own. A versatile left-sided player who could play at left-back, on the left wing, just behind the front two or as an out and out striker.

Abbas made his debut during the 1999 Pan-Arab games in Amman against Libya, scoring his first international goal in a 4–0 win against Lebanon. He played a part in the final against the hosts hitting the cross bar in extra time and was also one of three who hit the post in the penalty shoot-out.

International goals
Scores and results list Iraq's goal tally first.

Death
On 10 August 2012, Rahim died in a car crash on the road from Baghdad to Najaf. He was 33 years old.

References

External links

Sportspeople from Baghdad
Iraqi footballers
Iraq international footballers
2000 AFC Asian Cup players
1979 births
2012 deaths
Road incident deaths in Iraq
Al-Shorta SC players
Al-Karkh SC players
Al-Jaish Damascus players
Al-Zawraa SC players
Association football midfielders